The 1905 Texas Longhorns football team represented the University of Texas at Austin in the 1905 college football season. In their second year under head coach Ralph Hutchinson, the Longhorns compiled a 5–4.

Schedule

References

Texas
Texas Longhorns football seasons
Texas Longhorns football